Mainly for Women is an Australian television series which aired 1961 to 1964 on ABC. Hosted by Corinne Kerby, it was a daytime series aimed at women of the period. It was produced in Melbourne and shown interstate, and included segments on subjects such as cooking, fashion and interviews.

Examples of format
In one episode, there was a discussion chaired by Jean Battersby, tips on the game of bowls, the making of bread and buns, and a music interlude. In another episode, the segments included an interview with Joanne Lyne, "Beauty Box", and letters. Another episode featured "Beauty Box", a segment on "malayan cooking", and keep fit exercises.

See also
Your Home
The Home Show
Women's World
Wonderful World

References

External links
Mainly for Women on IMDb

1961 Australian television series debuts
1964 Australian television series endings
Australian non-fiction television series
English-language television shows
Black-and-white Australian television shows
Australian Broadcasting Corporation original programming